Hedylopsis is a genus of sea slugs, marine gastropod mollusks within the clade Acochlidiacea.

Taxonomy 
Hedylopsidae has been classified within the superfamily Hedylopsoidea in the taxonomy of Bouchet & Rocroi (2005).

Sensu Schrödl & Neusser (2010) Hedylopsis is the only genus in the family Hedylopsidae. It is placed within unranked clade Hedylopsacea.

Species 
There are only two species in the genus Hedylopsis:
 Hedylopsis spiculifera (Kowalevsky, 1901)
 Hedylopsis ballantinei Sommerfeldt & Schrödl, 2005

References

Hedylopsidae